Acemya acuticornis is a species of bristle fly in the family Tachinidae.

References

Taxa named by Johann Wilhelm Meigen
Exoristinae
Diptera of Asia
Diptera of Europe
Insects described in 1824